Jowzdan (also Romanized as Jowzdān and Jowzedān; also known as Jowzevān and Jūzūn) is a village in Baraan-e Shomali Rural District, in the Central District of Isfahan County, Isfahan Province, Iran. At the 2006 census, its population was 933, in 226 families.

References 

Populated places in Isfahan County